Miguel Ángel Villalta Hurtado (born June 16, 1981, in Cusco, Perú) is a Peruvian footballer who plays as a center back. He currently plays for José Gálvez in the Torneo Descentralizado.

Club career
After playing in several district teams, Miguel Villalta played for Cienciano's youth team in 1997, playing as a midfielder. In 1999, Villalta debuted with Cienciano's first team, when Cieniano's current coach, Franco Navarro, put him in as a defender in a match against Unión Minas.

In 2007, he suffered burns on the soles of his feet after playing on artificial turf or artificial pitch in blazing sun.

International career
Villalta has made 28 appearances for the Peru national football team.

References

External links

1981 births
Living people
People from Cusco
Association football central defenders
Peruvian footballers
Peru international footballers
Peruvian Primera División players
Cienciano footballers
Sporting Cristal footballers
Juan Aurich footballers
FBC Melgar footballers
José Gálvez FBC footballers
Atlético Minero footballers
2007 Copa América players